Cassinia telfordii is a species of flowering plant in the family Asteraceae and is endemic to eastern Australia. It is an erect shrub with hairy young stems, linear leaves and corymbs of up to several hundred yellow to cream-coloured flower heads.

Description
The upper surface of the leaves is dark, glossy green, the edges are rolled down and the lower surface is paler green. Up to several hundred heads are arranged in each round-topped corymb.

Taxonomy and naming
Cassinia telfordii was first formally described in 2004 by Anthony Edward Orchard in Australian Systematic Botany from specimens collected in the Mount Hyland Nature Reserve in 2004.

Distribution
Cassinia telfordii grows in forest and on the edges of rainforest at altitudes above  on the Northern Tablelands of New South Wales.

References

telfordii
Asterales of Australia
Flora of New South Wales
Plants described in 2004